Florencia Ponce de Leon (born 26 February 1992) is an Argentine handball player for the Liberbank Gijón and the Argentine national team.

She competed at the 2015 World Women's Handball Championship in Denmark.

Achievements
Argentine Clubs Championship: 2015

Individual awards and achievements

Best left back
2017 Pan American Women's Club Handball Championship

Top Scorer
2017 Pan American Women's Club Handball Championship

References

Argentine female handball players
1992 births
Living people
South American Games silver medalists for Argentina
South American Games medalists in handball
Expatriate handball players
Argentine expatriate sportspeople in Spain
Sportspeople from Buenos Aires
Competitors at the 2018 South American Games
21st-century Argentine women